The Bourne Imperative is the tenth novel in the Bourne series and seventh by Eric Van Lustbader. The book was released on June 5, 2012, as a sequel to The Bourne Dominion.

Plot summary

The man Jason Bourne fished out of the freezing sea is near death, half-drowned and bleeding profusely from a gunshot wound. He awakens with no memory of who he is or why he was shot-and Bourne is eerily reminded of his own amnesia. Then Bourne discovers that the Mossad agent named Rebeka is so determined to find this injured man that she has gone off the grid, cut her ties to her agency, and is now being stalked by Mossad's most feared killer. Do the answers to these mysteries lie back in southeast Lebanon, in a secret encampment to which Bourne and Rebeka escaped following a firefight weeks ago? The complex trail links to the mission given to Treadstone directors Peter Marks and Soraya Moore: find the semi-mythic terrorist assassin known as Nicodemo. In the course of Bourne's desperate, deadly search for a secret that will alter the future of the entire world, he will experience both triumph and loss, and his life will never be the same. Now everything turns on the amnesiac. Bourne must learn his identity and purpose before both he and Rebeka are killed. From Stockholm to Washington, D.C., from Mexico City to Beijing, the web of lies and betrayals extends into a worldwide conspiracy of monumental proportions.

Reception
David Pitt of Booklist commented, "Unlike Ludlum, whose prose frequently tended toward the stodgy, Van Lustbader pulls readers through the story with gusto, as Bourne confronts a man in a situation very much like his own, and Treadstone agents Marks and Moore try to determine whether they can trust a new man on the team. For series fans, a solid continuation of Bourne's story."

References

2012 American novels
American spy novels
American thriller novels

Bourne (novel series)
Novels by Eric Van Lustbader
Grand Central Publishing books